The Communist Party of India (Maoist) is a Marxist–Leninist–Maoist banned communist political party and militant organization in India which aims to overthrow the "semi-colonial and semi-feudal Indian state" through protracted people's war. It was founded on 21 September 2004, through the merger of the Communist Party of India (Marxist–Leninist) People's War (People's War Group) and the Maoist Communist Centre of India (MCCI). The party has been designated as a terrorist organisation in India under the Unlawful Activities (Prevention) Act since 2009.

In 2006, Prime Minister Manmohan Singh referred to the Maoists as "the single biggest internal security challenge" for India, and said that the "deprived and alienated sections of the population" form the backbone of the Maoist movement in India. The government officials have declared that, in 2013, 76 districts in the country were affected by "Left Wing extremism", with another 106 districts in ideological influence. In 2020, the activities of the party began to increase again in Telangana and other areas. Chhattishgarh is often affected by the party's militant activities.

History
The Communist Party of India (Maoist) was founded on 21 September 2004, through the merger of the Communist Party of India (Marxist–Leninist) People's War (People's War Group), and the Maoist Communist Centre of India (MCCI). The merger was announced on 14 October the same year. In the merger a provisional central committee was constituted, with the erstwhile People's War Group leader Muppala Lakshmana Rao, alias "Ganapathi", as general secretary. Further, on May Day 2014, the Communist Party of India (Marxist–Leninist) Naxalbari merged into the CPI (Maoist).

Ideology
The CPI (Maoist) observes that the Indian state is being "run by a collaboration of imperialists, the comprador bourgeoisie and feudal lords." According to the South Asia Terrorism Portal, the two factions of the Party adhered to differing strands of communism prior to their 2004 merger, although "both organizations shared their belief in the 'annihilation of class enemies' and in extreme violence as a means to secure organizational goals." The People's War Group (PWG) maintained a Marxist–Leninist stance, while the Maoist Communist Centre of India (MCCI) took a Maoist stance. After the merger, the PWG secretary of Andhra Pradesh announced that the newly formed CPI-Maoist would follow Marxism–Leninism–Maoism as its "ideological basis guiding its thinking in all spheres of its activities." Included in this ideology is a commitment to "protracted armed struggle" to undermine and to seize power from the state. On May Day 2014, Ganapathy and Ajith (Secretary of the CPI (ML) Naxalbari) also issued a joint statement stating that "the unified party would [continue to] take Marxism-Leninism-Maoism as its guiding ideology."

The ideology of the party is contained in a "Party Programme." In the document, the Maoists denounce globalisation as a war on the people by market fundamentalists and the caste system as a form of social oppression. The CPI (Maoist) claim that they are conducting a "people's war", a strategic approach developed by Mao Zedong during the guerrilla warfare phase of the Communist Party of China. Their eventual objective is to install a "people's government" via a New Democratic Revolution.

Location and prominence
CPI(M) currently operates in the forest belt around central India in the states of Chhattisgarh, Bihar, Jharkhand, Maharashtra, Odisha. It is present even in remote regions of Jharkhand and Andhra Pradesh, as well as in Bihar and the tribal-dominated areas in the borderlands of Chhattisgarh, Maharashtra, West Bengal, and Odisha. The CPI (Maoist) aims to consolidate its power in this area and establish a Compact Revolutionary Zone from which to advance the people's war in other parts of India. A 2005 Frontline cover story called the Bhamragad Taluka, where the Madia Gond Adivasis live, the heart of the Maoist-affected region in Maharashtra. Recently, the Indian government has claimed that in 2013, Andhra Pradesh, Arunachal Pradesh, Assam, Bihar, Chhattisgarh, Delhi, Gujarat, Haryana, Jharkhand, Karnataka, Kerala, Madhya Pradesh, Odisha, Punjab, Tamil Nadu, Tripura, Uttarakhand, Uttar Pradesh and West Bengal experienced [ideological] "influence" of "Left Wing Extremism"; while claiming that armed activity by the "Left Wing" extremists was noticed in Andhra Pradesh, Bihar, Chhattisgarh, Jharkhand, Karnataka, Kerala, Maharashtra, Odisha and West Bengal.

Organisation
The current General Secretary of CPI (Maoist) is Nambala Keshava Rao alias Basavaraj. He was appointed after Muppala Lakshmana Rao, who uses the alias "Ganapathy". The party hierarchy consists of the Regional Bureaus, which look after two or three states each, the State Committees, the Zonal Committees, the District Committees, and the "dalams" (armed squads). Communist writer Jan Myrdal noted that the CPI (Maoist) also organises events like "The Leadership Training Programme" to endure the forces of the state.

Politburo
As per the communist party policies the highest decision making body of the CPI (Maoist) is the Politburo, with thirteen or fourteen members, six of whom were killed or arrested between 2007 and 2010. Prashant Bose alias "Kishan-da" and Katakam Sudarshan alias Anand, are the two most prominent Politburo members of CPI (Maoist). B. Sudhakar alias "Kiran" is another Politburo member of CPI (Maoist). Shamsher Singh Sheri alias Karam Singh, who died of Cerebral Malaria-Jaundice on 30 October 2005, was also the party's Politburo member. Between 2005 and 2011, the State captured several Politburo members of the party, which includes – Sushil Roy alias Som, Narayan Sanyal alias N. Prasad, Pramod Mishra, Amitabh Bagchi, Kobad Ghandy, Baccha Prasad Singh, Anukul Chandra Naskar and Akhilesh Yadav. Ashutosh Tudu and Anuj Thakur are another two of the arrested Politburo members of the party. Arvind Ji alias Deo Kumar Singh, a politburo member died in heart attack on 21, March 2018. Among those killed, Cherukuri Rajkumar alias "Azad" and Mallojula Koteswara Rao alias "Kishenji", were two past members of the CPI (Maoist)'s Politburo. Politburo member Akkiraju Haragopal alias Ramkrishna died in October 2021 due to illness.

Central Committee
The Central Committee of the CPI (Maoist) takes command from the Politburo and passes on the information to its members, and has 32 members. During an interview in 2010, Anand told media personnels that out of the 45 members of the Central Committee of CPI (Maoist), 8 has been arrested and 22 has been killed by the agencies of the Indian government. Anuradha Ghandy, who died on 12 April 2008, was an eminent member of CPI (Maoist)'s Central Committee. Kadari Satyanarayan Reddy alias "Kosa", Thippiri Tirupathi alias "Devuji", Malla Raji Reddy and Mallujola Venugopal alias "Bhupati" are another three cadres and Central Committee members of the party. Madvi Hidma is the youngest Central Committee member of the party. As of 22 September 2011, nine of the Central Committee members were jailed, which includes – Moti Lal Soren, Vishnu, Varanasi Subramanyam, Shobha, Misir Besra, Jhantu Mukherjee, Vijay Kumar Arya. One more Central Committee member, Ravi Sharma, was also captured later. Ginugu Narsimha Reddy alias Jampanna surrendered to police in December 2017. Varkapur Chandramouli, Patel Sudhakar Reddy, Narmada Akka, and Milind Teltumbde who were killed by armed forces. Another Central Committee member Haribhushan died due to Covid. Another CC member B.G. Krishnamoorthy alias BGK, Vijay was arrested in 2021 November along with another PLGA Savithri by Kerala ATS.

Publication division
The CPI (Maoist) has a "publication division". Besides volunteering as a Politburo member of the party, B. Sudhakar alias "Kiran" also works for its publication division.

Military Commissions
The Central Military Commission (CMC) is the main armed body of the CPI (Maoist), and it is constructed by its Central Committee. In addition to the CMC, the party has also raised state military commissions. The CMC is headed by Nambala Keshava Rao alias Basavaraj. Anand and Arvind Ji are another two members of the organisation's CMC. Anuj Thakur is an arrested member of the CMC of the party. Kishenji and Chandramouli were also the members of the CPI (Maoist)'s CMC.

Technical Committee
Central Technical Committee (CTC) is given the responsibility of fabricating weapons and explosives. The Technical Committee consists of few selected members having special knowledge on science and research and works under the direct supervision of the Central Military Commission (CMC) of the Party. Sadanala Ramakrishna, a senior Maoist leader was the Secretary of the Committee who was arrested in February 2012 in Kolkata.

Estimated strength
The military wings of the founding organisations, the People's Liberation Guerrilla Army (the military wing of the MCCI) and the People's Guerrilla Army (the military wing of the PWG), also underwent a merger. The name of the unified military organisation is the People's Liberation Guerrilla Army (PLGA), and it is grouped into three sections — the Basic, the Secondary and the Main squad. All the PLGA members are volunteers and they do not receive any wages. During his stay in the guerrilla zones, Jan Myrdal noted that the female cadres of CPI (Maoist) constituted about 40% of its PLGA, and held numerous "command positions"; but currently, the female members comprises 60% of the Maoist cadres, and women commanders heads 20 of the 27 divisions of the guerrilla zones.

P.V. Ramana, of the Observer Research Foundation in Delhi, estimates the Naxilities' current strength at 9,000–10,000 armed fighters, with access to about 6,500 firearms. The analyses, as of September 2013, suggested that the estimated number of PLGA members has decreased from 10,000 − 12,000 to 8,000 − 9,000. But, Gautam Navlakha has suggested that the PLGA has strengthened over the past few years, and has mustered 12 companies and over 25 platoons and a supply platoon in 2013 as compared to 8 companies and 13 platoons of 2008. The People's Militia which is armed with bows, arrows, and machetes is and is believed to logistically assist the PLGA is estimated to be around 38,000.

Medical units
The Maoists had structured "medical units" in the villages of Bastar, and the CPI (Maoist) operates "mobile medical units." Rahul Pandita writes: 
Furthermore, the CPI (Maoist)'s medical services squads also move from village to village and provides "basic medical training" to selected young tribal people which enables them to identify frequently occurring diseases through their presages so that they can also distribute vaccines to the patients.

Frontal organisations
The frontal organisations of the party include the Radical Youth League, Rythu Coolie Sangham, Radical Students Union, Singareni Karmika Samakya, Viplava Karmika Samakhya, Porattam Kerala, Ayyankali pada Kerala, Njattuvela Kerala and All India Revolutionary Students Federation, Krantikari Adivasi Mahila Sangathan, and Chetna Natya Manch.

Strategy

Governance tactics
The "organising principles" of the Maoists are sketched out from the Chinese Communist Revolution and the Vietnam War. The CPI (Maoist) has organised Dandakaranya into ten divisions, each comprising three area committees; and every Area Committee is composed of several Janatana Sarkars (people's governments). The party says that a Janatana Sarkar is established by the election procedure involving a group of villages, and has nine departments — agriculture, trade and industry, economic, justice, defence, health, public relations, education and culture, and jungle. The Janatana Sarkar provides education up to primary level in the subjects of mathematics, social science, politics, and Hindi, in the "camp schools" using the textbooks published by the party in Gondi. They also use DVDs to educate the children in the streams of science and history.

In their efforts to intimidate their political adversaries and consolidate control, the Maoists tax local villagers, extort businesses, abduct and kill "class enemies" such as government officials and police officers, and regulate the flow of aid and goods. To help fill their ranks, the Maoists force each family under their domain to supply one family member, and threaten those who resist with violence.

The organisation has been holding "Public Courts", which have been described as kangaroo courts, against their opponents. These "courts" function in the areas under de facto Maoist control. The Maoists have also taken care to demolish government institutions under their de facto jurisdiction. They have also demolished railroad tracks and school buildings that are often used as temporary camps by security forces.

Military strategies and tactics
The CPI (Maoist) rejects "engagement" with what it terms as the "prevailing bourgeois democracy" and focuses on capturing political power through protracted armed struggle based on guerrilla warfare. This strategy entails building up bases in rural and remote areas and transforming them first into guerrilla zones, and then into "liberated zones", in addition to encircling cities.

The military hardware used by Maoists, as indicated through a number of seizures, include RDX cable wires, gelignite sticks, detonators, country-made weapons, INSAS rifles, AK-47s, SLRs, and improvised explosive devices. The Maoists condemn the accusations that they manage arms through China, Myanmar and Bangladesh. On the subject, Ganapathy says, "Our weapons are mainly country-made. All the modern weapons we have are mainly seized from the government armed forces when we attack them."

The CPI (Maoist)'s General Secretary says that they keep on appealing to the "lower-level personnel" in the paramilitary and police forces not to attack them, but rather "join hands with the masses" and "consciously" point their guns towards whom the Maoists view as "real enemies." They further claims that "only when the government forces come to attack us [Maoists] carrying guns do we attack them in self-defence." In Jharkhand, the police have also seized posters from various places which read, "Policemen keep away from the green hunt and try to be friends of poor. Police jawan, do not obey orders of the senior officials, instead join the people's army."

Funding
Some sources claim that the funding for the Maoists comes from abductions, extortion and by setting up unofficial administrations to collect taxes in rural areas where official government appears absent. Poppy cultivation is another suspected source of funding for Maoists in the Ghagra area of Gumla district in Jharkhand and in parts of Gumla, Kishanganj and Purnia districts in Bihar where security forces claim that opium fields are hidden among maize crops. Reports from Debagarh district in Odisha indicate that the Maoists also support hemp cultivation to help fund their activities.

Legal status
The party is regarded as a "left-wing extremist entity" and a terrorist outfit by the Indian government. Several of their members have been arrested under the now-defunct Prevention of Terrorist Activities Act. The group is officially banned by the state governments of Odisha, Chhattisgarh, and Andhra Pradesh, among others. The party has protested these bans. The Indian government, led by the United Progressive Alliance, banned the CPI (Maoist) under the Unlawful Activities (Prevention) Act (UAPA) as a terrorist organisation on 22 June 2009. On 22 June 2009, the central home ministry, keeping in mind the growing unlawful activities by the group, banned it under the Unlawful Activities (Prevention) Act (UAPA). Earlier, the union home minister, P. Chidambaram had asked the West Bengal Chief Minister, Buddhadeb Bhattacharjee, to ban the Maoists following the Lalgarh Violence. Maoist Communist Centre (MCC) and all its formations and front organisations have been banned by the Government of India.

Controversies

Opposition
The Party is regarded as a serious security threat and the Indian government is taking countermeasures, pulling the affected states together to co-ordinate their response. It says it will combine improved policing with socio-economic measures to defuse grievances that fuel the Maoist cause.
In 2005, Chhattisgarh State sponsored an anti-Maoist movement called the Salwa Judum. The group, which the BBC alleges is "government backed", an allegation rejected by the Indian government has come under criticism for "perpetrating atrocities and abuse against women", using child soldiers, burning people alive, and the looting of property and destruction of homes. These allegations were rejected by a fact-finding commission of the National Human Rights Commission of India, appointed by the Supreme Court of India, who determined that the Salwa Judum was a spontaneous reaction by tribes against Maoist atrocities perpetrated against them. The camps are guarded by police officers, paramilitary forces and child soldiers empowered with the official title "special police officer" (SPO).
However, on 5 July 2011, the Supreme Court of India declared the Salwa Judum as illegal and unconstitutional. The court directed the Chhattisgarh government to recover all the firearms given to the militia along with the ammunition and accessories. It also ordered the government to investigate all instances of alleged criminal activities of Salwa Judum. But, the state government did not abide by the Supreme Court's decision. In August 2013, the Supreme Court of India asked the state government to explain that "why its failure to execute the July 2011 order of disbanding the SPOs not considered as contempt of court.". In March 2019, a municipal school teacher, Yogendra Meshram was killed by the Maoists in Korchi, which was vehemently protested by locals. The Maoist leadership later apologized for the killing stating it to be a mistake and that Meshram was innocent wrongly suspected to be a police informer.

International connections
The CPI (Maoist) maintains dialogue with the Communist Party of Nepal (Maoist Centre) who control most of Nepal in the Coordination Committee of Maoist Parties and Organisations of South Asia (CCOMPOSA), according to several intelligence sources and think tanks. These links are, however, denied by the Communist Party of Nepal (Maoist-Centre)

While under detention in June 2009, a suspected Lashkar-e-Taiba (LeT) operative indicated that the LeT and the CPI (Maoist) had attempted to co-ordinate activities in Jharkhand state. But, Ganapathy has denied any links between CPI (Maoist) and LeT, stating that the allegations are "only mischievous, calculated propaganda by the police officials, bureaucrats and leaders of the reactionary political parties" to malign the Maoists' image with the aim of labeling them as terrorists in order to justify "their brutal terror campaign against Maoists and the people in the areas of armed agrarian struggle." Kishenji also criticised LeT for having "wrong" and "anti-people" policies; though he said that the Maoists may consider backing up a few of their demands, if LeT will halt its "terrorist acts".

Reports in 2010 indicate that the Communist Party of the Philippines, Southeast Asia's longest-lived communist insurgent group, has been reported to have engaged in training activities for guerrilla warfare with Indian Maoists.

The Indian Maoists deny operational links with foreign groups, such as the Nepalese Maoists, but do claim comradeship. Some members of the Indian government accept this, while others argue that operational links do exist, with training coming from Sri-Lankan Maoists and small arms from China. China denies any suggestion that it supports foreign Maoist rebels, citing improvements in relations between India and China, including movement towards resolving their border disputes. Maoists in Nepal, India, and the Philippines are less reticent about their shared goals.

Indian Government's paramilitary offensive against the CPI (Maoist)

In September 2009, an all-out offensive was launched by the Government of India's paramilitary forces and the state's police forces against the CPI (Maoist) is termed by the Indian media as the "Operation Green Hunt".

On 3 January 2013, government issued a statement that it is deploying 10,000 more central paramilitary personnel in Bastar, Odisha and some parts of Jharkhand. On 8 June 2014, the Minister of Home Affairs officially approved the deployment of another 10,000 troops from the paramilitary forces to fight against the Maoists in Chhattisgarh. The count of personnel from State Armed Police Forces involved in counter-Maoism operations in the Red corridor is estimated to number around 200,000. Along with firearms, the armed forces' personnel use satellite phones, unmanned aerial vehicles and Air Force helicopters.

In 2011, the Indian Army while denying its direct role in the offensive operations accepted that it has been training the paramilitary personnel to fight against the Maoists, however, the Maoists have objected to the Army's stationing in the Red corridor. On 30 May 2013, the Indian Air Force's Air Chief Marshal declared that apart from the currently operating MI-17 helicopters, the Indian Force has decided to induce a unit of MI-17V5 helicopters to "provide full support to anti-Naxal operations." In August 2014, the Ministry of Home Affairs had stated that 2,000 personnel from the Nagaland's Indian Reserve Battalions (IRB) were deployed in counter-insurgency and counter-terrorism operations against the Maoists in Bastar.

Since the start of the operation: 2,266 Maoist militants have been killed, 10,181 have been arrested and 9,714 have surrendered.

Notable attacks

On 12 June 2009, at least 29 members of the Indian Police were killed in an ambush attack by Maoist rebels in Rajnandgaon, 90 km (56 mi) from Raipur (India's Chhattisgarh state).
On 15 February 2010, several of the guerrilla commanders of CPI (Maoist), all of whom are believed to be female, killed 24 personnel of the Eastern Frontier Rifles at Silda in West Bengal. The attack was directed by Kishenji, and after the Maoist raid at the paramilitary camp, Kishenji addressed the news media saying, "We have not started it (violence) and we will not stop it first. Let us see whether the central government is honest about a solution and we will definitely co–operate.... This is the answer to Chidambaram's 'Operation Green Hunt' and unless the Centre stop this inhuman military operation, we are going to answer the Centre this way only."
On 6 April 2010, the Maoists ambushed and killed 76 paramilitary personnel who fell into a trap laid by the lurking Maoists. The CPI (Maoist) described the incident as a "direct consequence" of the Operation Green Hunt stating that "We have been surrounded by paramilitary battalions. They are setting fire to the forests and making adivasis (tribals) flee. In this situation, we have no other alternative (but to stage attacks)."
On 25 May 2013, the CPI (Maoist) ambushed a convoy of the Indian National Congress at Bastar, and killed 27 people including Mahendra Karma, Nand Kumar Patel and Vidya Charan Shukla. While regretting the death of a few "innocent Congress [INC] functionaries" during the incident, they hold the Bharatiya Janata Party and Indian National Congress' policies which they view as "anti-people" in nature, as directly responsible for the attack. Later, 14 Maoist who had allegedly participated in the ambush were gunned down in Odisha by the Special Operation Group with the assistance of Border Security Force.
On 3 April 2021, twenty-two soldiers were killed in a Maoist ambush on the border of Bijapur and Sukma districts in southern Chhattisgarh. Those killed included 14 Chhattisgarh policemen and seven jawans of the CRPF, including six members of its elite CoBRA unit, specially trained to take on Maoist guerillas.
On 4 January 2022, CPI (Maoist) attacked former BJP MLA of Manoharpur Gurucharan Nayak in West Singhbhum district of Jharkhand. Nayak escaped but the Maoists slit the throat of his two bodyguards, snatched their AK-47 rifles and fled. The two bodyguards died in the incident.

See also

List of organisations banned by the Government of India
Anti-revisionism
Operation Steeplechase
Revolutionary Internationalist Movement
List of communist parties
List of Naxalite and Maoist groups in India
Red Ant Dream
Deo Kumar Singh
Ganapathy (Maoist)

References

External links
An exclusive interview to The Hindu by Azad, spokesperson of the Communist Party of India (Maoist), The Hindu
Interview With Communist Party of India (Maoist) Spokesperson Azad, The Hindu
Interview With Comrade Ganapathy, General Secretary (GS), CPI (Maoist) given to Swedish writer Jan Myrdal and Gautam Navlakha, January 2010
The French journalist, Vanessa's conversation with Narmada and several other Comrades, OPEN
What is daily life inside a Maoist forest hideout like? — BBC
India's Red Tide — SBS Dateline
 International Campaign Against War on the People in India
 Are We The Enemy You Fear?, Tehelka
 The heart of India is under attack, The Guardian

 
2004 establishments in India
Anti-imperialist organizations
Communist parties in India
Communist terrorism
Far-left politics in India
Maoist organisations in India
Organisations designated as terrorist by India
Organizations based in Asia designated as terrorist
Political parties established in 2004